Moriceau is a French surname. Notable people with the surname include:

Jules Moriceau (1887–1977), French racing driver
Norma Moriceau (1944–2016), Australian costume designer and production designer
Tobías Moriceau (born 1997), Argentine footballer

French-language surnames